Ian Beattie (born 3 March 1965) is an actor from Northern Ireland. He is best known for playing Antigonus in the film Alexander (2004) and Ser Meryn Trant in the television series Game of Thrones (2011–2015).

Career
Beattie’s start in acting began at an early age, when he used to tour Northern Ireland in a circus with his father. His most notable role is Ser Meryn Trant in five seasons of the HBO fantasy drama Game of Thrones. He has also appeared in numerous other television and film projects, including Antigonus in Oliver Stone's Alexander, Beorhtwulf of Mercia in an episode of History Channel's Vikings and Showtime's The Tudors.

On stage, he starred in the play Demented by playwright Gary Mitchell at the Lyric Theatre in Belfast.

Filmography

Film

Television

References

External links

21st-century male actors from Northern Ireland
Living people
Male television actors from Northern Ireland
Male film actors from Northern Ireland
Place of birth missing (living people)
20th-century male actors from Northern Ireland
1965 births